Alexandre Julliard (born 1970) is a computer programmer who is best known as the project leader for Wine, a compatibility layer to run Microsoft Windows programs on Unix-like operating systems.

Julliard studied computer science at the Swiss Federal Institute of Technology in Lausanne. He spent most of the 1990s working on embedded systems. He now works full-time on Wine for CodeWeavers.

Julliard enjoys astronomy and lives in Lausanne, Switzerland.

References

External links
OSNews interview, October 2001 - Interview with WINE's Alexandre Julliard - posted by Eugenia Loli-Queru on Mon 29th Oct 2001 17:25 UTC
Wine HQ - WWN Issue #348:Wine Newsletter interview regarding Wine 1.0 release (6/18/2008)
Wine HQ - WWN Issue #336:Wine Newsletter Interview with Mr. Alexandre Julliard (12/24/2007)
YouTube video of: WINE Conference 2007 Keynote speech by Alexandre Julliard(October 7, 2007)

1970 births
Living people
Swiss computer programmers
Date of birth missing (living people)
Place of birth missing (living people)
Chief technology officers
Free software programmers
Linux people